Johann Christian Mikan (born 5 December 1769 in Teplitz, died 28 December 1844 in Prague) was an Austrian-Czech botanist, zoologist and entomologist.  He was the son of Joseph Gottfried Mikan.

Career
Mikan was a professor of natural history at the University of Prague.  He was one of three leading naturalists on the Austrian Brazil Expedition.

He wrote Monographia Bombyliorum Bohemiæ, iconibus illustrata in 1796, Entomologische Beobachtungen, Berichtigungen und Entdeckungen in 1797, and Delectus Florae et Faunae Brasiliensis, etc. in 1820. Mikan described many new species, including the black lion tamarin.

Mikan is commemorated in the scientific name of a species of South American snake, Dipsas mikanii.

The genus Mikania Willd. (Asteraceae) was named for his father Joseph Gottfried Mikan (1743–1814), professor of botany and chemistry at the Prague University.

See also
Mikan (disambiguation)

Bibliography
Books by J. C. Mikan on WorldCat

References

Further reading
Anonymous (1852). [Mikan, J. C.] Lotos 2: 63–65. 
Eiselt JN (1836). Geschichte, Systematik und Literatur der Insectenkunde, von den ältesten Zeiten bis auf die Gegenwart. Als Handbuch für den Jünger und als Repertorium für den Meister der Entomologie bearbeitet. Leipzig: C. H. F. Hartmann. (in German).
Evenhuis NL (1997). Litteratura taxonomica dipterorum (1758–1930). Volume 1 (A-K); Volume 2 (L-Z). Leiden. (in Latin).
Stearn T (1956). "Mikan's Delectus Florae et Faunae Brasiliensis ". J. Soc. Bibliog.Nat. Hist. 3 (3): 135–136 .

External links
Detailed biography in the Neue deutsche Biographie.

Czech botanists
19th-century Austrian zoologists
Czech zoologists
Czech entomologists
Austrian entomologists
Botanists with author abbreviations
Austrian people of Czech descent
People from Teplice
1769 births
1844 deaths
18th-century Austrian zoologists